Anson Phelps Stokes may refer to:

 Anson Phelps Stokes (1838–1913), merchant, banker, publicist, and multimillionaire
 Anson Phelps Stokes (philanthropist) (1874–1958), educator and clergyman; son of the banker
 Anson Phelps Stokes (bishop) (1905–1986), Episcopal bishop of Massachusetts and son of the philanthropist